Hussein Ibrahim Ahmed Mursal (born 23 September 1998) is a Sudanese footballer who plays as a centre-back for Sudanese club Al-Khartoum and the Sudan national team.

International career
Al Jarf made his debut for the Sudan national team on 9 June 2017, at the 2019 Africa Cup of Nations against Madagascar.

References

External links
 
 

1998 births
Living people
Association football central defenders
Sudanese footballers
Sudan international footballers
Al-Hilal Club (Omdurman) players
Al Khartoum SC players
Sudan A' international footballers
2018 African Nations Championship players